Douré may refer to several places in Burkina Faso:

Douré, Bam
Douré, Boudry
Douré, Boulgou
Douré, Boulkiemdé
Douré, Doulougou
Douré, Zorgho